Live Stiffs Live is a live album released in 1978 by Stiff Records. It compiles concert performances by several of the record label's artists recorded during the "Live Stiffs Tour", which ran from 3 October to 5 November 1977.

Songs 
Among the recording artists featured on the album are Elvis Costello and the Attractions, Ian Dury & the Blockheads, Nick Lowe, Wreckless Eric, and Larry Wallis. The album opens with tour MC (and later Clash road manager) Kosmo Vinyl calling audience members away from the bar and introducing the first act as "Nick Lowe's Led Zeppelin". The final cut of the album is a performance of Ian Dury's hit, "Sex & Drugs & Rock & Roll" performed by all of the tour's artists and crew.

Release
The album has various names from Stiffs Live Stiffs, Stiffs Live and Live Stiffs. The correct name of the original Stiff Records release on 17 February 1978 was Live Stiffs Live. The album was later re-issued on Music for Pleasure (MFP 50445) as simply Live Stiffs.

The album entered the UK Albums Chart on 11 March 1980, eventually peaking at number 28.

Live Stiffs Live was later released by Demon Records on CD in 1994 (Demon 621) and re-released in 1997 (Edsel 621 & Diablo Records 851).

Critical reception 
Reviewing in Christgau's Record Guide: Rock Albums of the Seventies (1981), Robert Christgau wrote:

In a retrospective review, AllMusic's Stephen Thomas Erlewine said "the entire record captures the wild, careening spirit of Stiff — it's fun, trashy rock & roll."

Track listing

Side one
 "I Knew the Bride" (Nick Lowe) - Nick Lowe's Last Chicken in the Shop - 3.25
 "Let's Eat" (Lowe) - Nick Lowe's Last Chicken in the Shop - 2.44
 "Semaphore Signals" (Wreckless Eric) - Wreckless Eric & the New Rockets - 3.25
 "Reconnez Cherie" (Eric) - Wreckless Eric & the New Rockets - 3.45
 "Police Car" (Larry Wallis) - Larry Wallis' Psychedelic Rowdies - 3.59

Side two
 "I Just Don't Know What to Do with Myself" (Burt Bacharach, Hal David) - Elvis Costello & the Attractions - 2.27
 "Miracle Man" (Elvis Costello) - Elvis Costello & the Attractions - 3.56
 "Billericay Dickie" (Ian Dury) - Ian Dury & the Blockheads - 4.24
 "Wake Up & Make Love with Me" (Dury) - Ian Dury & the Blockheads - 3.32
 "Sex Drugs Rock & Roll & Chaos" (Dury) - All artists  - 5.41

Personnel
Nick Lowe's Last Chicken in the Shop (side one, tracks 1 & 2)
Nick Lowe - bass, vocals
Larry Wallis - guitar
Terry Williams - drums
Pete Thomas - drums
Dave Edmunds - guitar
Penny Tobin - keyboards
Wreckless Eric & the New Rockets (side one, tracks 3 & 4)
Wreckless Eric - guitar, vocals
Davey Payne - saxophone
Denise Roudette - bass
Ian Dury - drums
Larry Wallis' Psychedelic Rowdies (side one, track 5)
Larry Wallis - guitar, vocals
Nick Lowe - bass
Penny Tobin - keyboards
Terry Williams - drums
Pete Thomas - drums
Elvis Costello & the Attractions (side two, tracks 1 & 2)
Elvis Costello - vocals, guitar
Steve Nieve - keyboards
Bruce Thomas - bass
Pete Thomas - drums
Ian Dury & the Blockheads (side two, tracks 3 & 4) 
Ian Dury - vocals
John Turnbull - guitar
Charley Charles - drums
Norman Watt-Roy - bass
Chaz Jankel - guitar
Mickey Gallagher - keyboards
Davey Payne - saxophone

See also
Stiff Records discography

References

1978 live albums
Live new wave albums
Stiff Records live albums